The former Walter Buck Wildlife Management Area is a 2,200-acre section of land that is now part of South Llano River State Park near Junction, Texas.

External links 
 Texas Parks and Wildlife Department page for South Llano River State Park

Protected areas of Kimble County, Texas
Protected areas of Texas